Novye Karyavdy (Yañı Qaryawźı) is a rural locality (a selo) in Michurinsky Selsoviet, Sharansky District, Bashkortostan, Russia. The population was 118 as of 2010. There are 3 streets.

Geography 
Novye Karyavdy is located 12 km northeast of Sharan (the district's administrative centre) by road. Stary Kichkinyash is the nearest rural locality.

References 

Rural localities in Sharansky District